Huka Falls is a set of waterfalls on the Waikato River, which drains Lake Taupō in New Zealand.

A few hundred metres upstream from Huka Falls, the Waikato River narrows from approximately 100 metres across to a canyon only 15 metres across. The canyon is carved into lake floor sediments laid down before Taupō Volcano's Oruanui eruption 26,500 years ago.

The volume of water flowing through often approaches 220,000 litres per second, making it one of the highest flowing waterfalls in the world. The flow rate is regulated by Mercury NZ Ltd through the Taupō Control Gates as part of their hydro system planning, with Waikato Regional Council dictating flows during periods of downstream flooding in the Waikato River catchment. Mercury NZ have ability to control the flows between 50,000 litres per second (or 50 m3/s) and 319,000 litres per second (319 m3/s).

At the top of the falls is a set of small waterfalls dropping about 8 metres. The final stage of the falls is a 6-metre drop, raised to an effective 11m fall by the depth of the water.  The falls are a popular tourist attraction, being close to Taupō and readily accessible from State Highway 1.

The falls featured in a national scandal in February 1989 when the body of cricket umpire Peter Plumley-Walker was found downstream, with wrists and ankles bound. The resulting investigation exposed the Auckland bondage scene. Dominatrix Renee Chignall was acquitted of his murder after three trials.

See also
Waterfalls of New Zealand

References

Taupō District
Waterfalls of Waikato
Waikato River